The 1998 WNBA season was the Women's National Basketball Association's second season. The 1998 season saw two expansion teams join the league, the Detroit Shock and Washington Mystics. The expansion teams allowed the defending champions Houston Comets to move to the Western Conference. The regular season was extended from 28 games to 30 games. The season ended with the Comets winning their second WNBA championship. During the season, Kelly Boucher became the first Canadian to play in the league, suiting up for the Charlotte Sting.

Regular season standings
Eastern Conference

Western Conference

Season award winners

Playoffs

There were 10 teams in the league. For the playoffs, the four teams with the best record in the league were seeded one to four. Houston was switched to the Western Conference in 1997 so two Western Conference teams matched up in the WNBA Finals. Each round of the playoffs was played as a best-of-three series.

Coaches

Eastern Conference
Charlotte Sting: Marynell Meadors
Cleveland Rockers: Linda Hill-MacDonald
Detroit Shock: Nancy Lieberman
New York Liberty: Nancy Darsch and Richie Adubato
Washington Mystics: Jim Lewis and Cathy Parson

Western Conference
Houston Comets: Van Chancellor
Los Angeles Sparks: Julie Rousseau and Orlando Woolridge
Phoenix Mercury: Cheryl Miller
Sacramento Monarchs: Heidi VanDerveer
Utah Starzz: Frank Layden

References

External links
 1998 WNBA Awards
 1998 WNBA Playoffs

 
1998
1998 in American women's basketball
1998–99 in American basketball by league
1997–98 in American basketball by league